Mozhayskoye is a rural locality (a selo) and the administrative center of Mozhayskoye Rural Settlement, Kashirsky District, Voronezh Oblast, Russia. The population was 722 as of 2010. There are 6 streets.

Geography 
Mozhayskoye is located 13 km south of Kashirskoye (the district's administrative centre) by road. Zaprudskoye is the nearest rural locality.

References 

Rural localities in Kashirsky District, Voronezh Oblast